The Simpsons: Bart vs. the World is a side-scrolling platform game based on the Simpsons franchise and features many aspects from the television series. It was released in 1991 for the Nintendo Entertainment System, and in 1993 for Amiga, Atari ST, Game Gear and Sega Master System. In the game, the player controls Bart as he travels around the world on a scavenger hunt while facing against Mr. Burns' family and agents. The game has received mixed reviews from critics.

Plot
The game is based on the animated television series The Simpsons. On the Krusty the Clown Show, Bart Simpson wins the opportunity to participate in a Round-the-World scavenger hunt. However, the contest has been rigged by Mr. Burns' assistant, Smithers, in order for Burns to rid himself of the Simpson family for all the trouble they have caused him over the years. Burns sends his agents and fellow family members to take care of the Simpsons during the scavenger hunt. Bart travels through various real-world locations collecting items, with occasional cameos from the other Simpsons family members.

Gameplay
The Simpsons: Bart vs. the World is a 2D side-scrolling platform game. Single-player is the only mode available. There are four major areas in the game: China, the North Pole, Egypt and Hollywood, and each has several stages to play through. The final stage of each area pits Bart against a boss — all of which are members of the Burns clan: third cousin Fu Manchu Burns, second cousin's grand-nephew The Abominable Snow Burns, maternal grand-uncle Ramses Burns and unspecified relation Eric von Burns.

In each stage, Bart must navigate through the area, collecting items such as firecracker balls for self-defense and Squishees to restore health (Bart can take up to five hits before dying). By grabbing a cape, Bart can become his superheroic alter-ego, Bartman, and fly for limited periods. The most important items in each stage are Krusty-brand souvenirs. There is one in every stage, and Bart must find them all in order to get the best ending (as well as unlocking a bonus Hollywood level). The other Simpsons also appear to give hints on where the souvenirs are. There are also several mini-games in each area, with puzzles such as a matching-card game and a trivia game based on events in actual episodes (from the first two seasons only).

Development
The game was first developed by Imagineering and published by Acclaim in 1991 for the home console Nintendo Entertainment System (NES).<ref name=gs-search>{{cite web|title=Search results for 'Bart vs the World|url=http://www.gamespot.com/search.html?qs=%22Bart+vs+the+World%22&tag=topsearchbox|publisher=GameSpot|accessdate=2011-08-04}}</ref> It was the second The Simpsons game to be released for the NES, after Bart vs. the Space Mutants. In 1993, Bart vs. the World was released for the home console Sega Master System (SMS), the personal computers Atari ST and Amiga, and the handheld console Game Gear (GG). The publishers for these versions were Flying Edge (SMS and GG), Virgin Games (Amiga), and Acclaim (ST). The developers were Arc Developments (GG and ST) and Virgin Games (Amiga). The NES version of the game includes the theme song from The Simpsons.

 Reception 

Reviews of Bart vs. the World have been mixed. GamePro gave the NES version an 80/100 rating, commenting that "after running him through the rigors of a zany-but-strenuous Nintendo workout, the conclusion of this review became obvious: if ya loved Bart in Bart vs. the Space Mutants, you're gonna like him in Bart vs. the World. Despite a few shortcomings here and there, Bart's new cart is a world-beater!" Tribune Media Services also gave it a positive review, writing that "the storyline is great, the graphics, as Bart would say, are 'cool, man', and the action and control are terrific. This version of The Simpsons is a lot more complex than the first — not harder, there's just more to it."

AllGame's Brett Alan Weiss was more negative, giving the NES version 2.5/5 stars. He wrote that "most of the puzzles [...] are childish and boring. Even younger kids will get tired with these silly little games after a while. [...] The Simpsons trivia is kind of cool; you'll find yourself remembering fondly several of the earlier episodes. However, the questions begin repeating themselves a little sooner than they should." He added that "once you are through toying around with the puzzles, you'll find that the meat of the game is lame as well. The level design is far from clever, the controls are sluggish, and the action is dull." A review in the Italian newspaper La Repubblica said the game was "very playable, though not particularly original."

The Dutch magazine Power Unlimited rated the Game Gear version 70/100, noting that it "consists partly of boring platform worlds" that are "not really worth the effort". They added, however, that "fortunately, there are also some simple puzzle games that are fun" and keep the game above mediocrity. A Game Players review gave the Game Gear version a 62/100 rating. The magazine wrote that "the twisted humor of other Simpsons games isn't there and the action segments could be from any game. Ignore it for home, but pack it for the beach."

In 2009, 1UP.com editor Bob Mackey reviewed the NES game in 1UP.com's official Retro Gaming Blog. He wrote that it had the same problems that Bart vs. the Space Mutants had, such as "lousy jumping physics", and that it "also manages to strip away the novelty that made the original Simpsons NES game worth checking out in the first place. The sequel is a straight-up, cookie-cutter platformer without any real Simpson-y touches to satisfy fans of the show; Bart finds himself wandering through generic side-scrolling levels, with a Simpsons character showing up every now and then to remind you that this is an actual licensed product and not just a ROM hack."Entertainment Weekly'' gave the game a B and wrote that "A nice multicultural touch — at one point in this travel-action game, Bart skateboards down China's Great Wall — puts this a notch above Acclaim's other Simpsons games, if not up to the standards of the irrepressibly subversive TV show."

References

External links

1991 video games
Acclaim Entertainment games
Action video games
Amiga games
Arc Developments games
Atari ST games
Game Gear games
Hollywood, Los Angeles in fiction
Imagineering (company) games
Master System games
Nintendo Entertainment System games
Platform games
Single-player video games
Video games about children
Bart vs. The World
Video games developed in the United States
Video games scored by Mark Van Hecke
Video games set in California
Video games set in China
Video games set in Egypt
Video games set in the Arctic